Hong Deok-young (Hangul: 홍덕영, Hanja: 洪德永; 5 May 1926 – 13 September 2005) was a South Korean football player, manager and referee. He was one of the first South Koreans to be capped for their country at international level. He was the goalkeeper of the South Korean national team for the 1948 Summer Olympics, 1954 FIFA World Cup and 1954 Asian Games. After retiring, he became an international football referee from 1957 to 1967. In later life, Hong went blind due to complication of diabetes mellitus, which already had an impact on his eyesight during his professional years, requiring him to wear glasses on the pitch. He died on 13 September 2005.

International career
Seoul FC, temporary national team before the Republic of Korea was established, left for Shanghai in April 1947 and played five matches against Shanghai's amateur football teams. Hong participated in these games.

Hong participated in the 1948 Summer Olympics, South Korea's first international tournament, and contributed to South Korea's first-ever victory against Mexico. In the quarter-finals, however, South Korea met the eventual champions Sweden and lost 12–0, the margin of their biggest defeat so far. He struggled in Sweden's 48 shots, and was wounded in the chest after the match.

Hong was selected for the national team for the 1954 FIFA World Cup in Switzerland. South Korea qualified for the World Cup by defeating Japan in the qualification. However, Korean players got airline tickets late, and arrived in Switzerland ten hours before the start of their first match. They lost 9–0 to Hungary's "Magical Magyars" in their first match. They met Hungary in the worst condition after they took an airplane for 46 hours, and four players of them left the field in exhaustion during the match. The substitute system didn't exist in football at the time, and so South Korea finished the match with only seven players. The South Korean manager Kim Yong-sik changed seven players in the second line-up due to his concern about players' stamina, but they lost 7–0 to Turkey. Hong played all of the two matches and became the goalkeeper who conceded the most goals in a single World Cup by conceding 16 goals.

Career statistics

International

Honours
Joseon Textile
Korean President's Cup runner-up: 1952, 1953, 1954

South Korea
Asian Games silver medal: 1954

Individual
Korean FA Hall of Fame: 2005

References

External links
 

1926 births
2005 deaths
Association football goalkeepers
South Korean footballers
South Korea international footballers
South Korean football managers
South Korean football referees
1954 FIFA World Cup players
Olympic footballers of South Korea
Footballers at the 1948 Summer Olympics
Asian Games medalists in football
Footballers at the 1954 Asian Games
Asian Games silver medalists for South Korea
Medalists at the 1954 Asian Games